John Houseman (born Jacques Haussmann; September 22, 1902 – October 31, 1988) was a Romanian-born British-American actor and producer of theatre, film, and television. He became known for his highly publicized collaboration with director Orson Welles from their days in the Federal Theatre Project through to the production of Citizen Kane and his collaboration, as producer of The Blue Dahlia, with writer Raymond Chandler on the screenplay. He is perhaps best known for his role as Professor Charles W. Kingsfield in the film The Paper Chase (1973), for which he won the Academy Award for Best Supporting Actor. He reprised his role as Kingsfield in the 1978 television series adaptation.

Early life
Houseman was born Jacques Haussmann on September 22, 1902, in Bucharest, Romania, the son of May (née Davies) a governess and Georges Haussmann, who ran a grain business. His mother was British, from a Christian family of Welsh and Irish descent. His father was an Alsatian-born Jew. He was educated in England at Clifton College, became a British subject, and worked in the grain trade in London before emigrating to the United States in 1925, where he took the stage name of John Houseman. He became a United States citizen in 1943.

Theatre producer 
Houseman worked as a speculator in the international grain markets, only turning to the theater following the 1929 stock market crash.

On Broadway he co-wrote Three and One (1933) and And Be My Love (1934). Composer Virgil Thomson recruited him to direct Four Saints in Three Acts (1934), Thomson's collaboration with Gertrude Stein. He later directed The Lady from the Sea (1934), Valley Forge (1934).

Collaboration with Orson Welles 
In 1934, Houseman was looking to cast Panic, a play he was producing based on a drama by Archibald MacLeish concerning a Wall Street financier whose world crumbles about him when consumed by the crash of 1929. Although the central figure is a man in his late fifties, Houseman became obsessed by the notion that a young man named Orson Welles he had seen in Katharine Cornell's production of Romeo and Juliet was the only person qualified to play the leading role. Welles consented and, after preliminary conversations, agreed to leave the play he was in after a single night to take the lead in Houseman's production. Panic opened at the Imperial Theatre on March 15, 1935. Among the cast was Houseman's ex-wife, Zita Johann, who had co-starred with Boris Karloff three years earlier in Universal's The Mummy.

Although the play opened to indifferent notices and ran for a mere three performances, it nevertheless led to the forging of a theatrical team, a fruitful but stormy partnership in which Houseman said Welles "was the teacher, I, the apprentice."

He supervised the direction of Walk Together Chillun in 1936.

Federal Theatre Project 
In 1936, the Federal Theatre Project of the Works Progress Administration put unemployed theatre performers and employees to work. The Negro Theatre Unit of the Federal Theatre Project was headed by Rose McClendon, a well-known black actress, and Houseman, a theatre producer. Houseman describes the experience in one of his memoirs:
Within a year of its formation, the Federal Theatre had more than fifteen thousand men and women on its payroll at an average wage of approximately twenty dollars a week. During the four years of its existence its productions played to more than thirty million people in more than two hundred theatres as well as portable stages, school auditoriums and public parks the country over.

Macbeth (1936) 

Houseman immediately hired Welles and assigned him to direct Macbeth for the FTP's Negro Theater Unit, a production that became known as the "Voodoo Macbeth", as it was set in the Haitian court of King Henri Christophe (and with voodoo witch doctors for the three Weird Sisters) and starred Jack Carter in the title role. The incidental music was composed by Virgil Thomson. The play premiered at the Lafayette Theatre on April 14, 1936, to enthusiastic reviews and remained sold out for each of its nightly performances. The play was regarded by critics and patrons as an enormous, if controversial, success. After 10 months with the Negro Theater Project, however, Houseman felt he was faced with the dilemma of risking his future:

... on a partnership with a 20-year-old boy in whose talent I had unquestioning faith but with whom I must increasingly play the combined and tricky roles of producer, censor, adviser, impresario, father, older brother and bosom friend.

Houseman later produced for the Negro Theatre Unit Turpentine (1936) without Welles.

In 1936, Houseman and Welles were running a WPA unit in midtown Manhattan for classic productions called Project No. 891. Their first production was Christopher Marlowe's Tragical History of Dr. Faustus which Welles directed while also playing the title role.

Houseman and Welles put on Horse Eats Hat (1936). Houseman, without Welles, helped in the direction of Leslie Howard's production of Hamlet (1936).

The Cradle Will Rock (1937) 

In June 1937, Project No. 891 produced their most controversial work with The Cradle Will Rock. Written by Marc Blitzstein, the musical was about Larry Foreman, a worker in Steeltown (played in the original production by Howard da Silva), which is run by the boss, Mister Mister (played in the original production by Will Geer).  The show was thought to have had left-wing and unionist sympathies (Foreman ends the show with a song about "unions" taking over the town and the country), and became legendary as an example of a "censored" show. Shortly before the show was to open, FTP officials in Washington announced that no productions would open until after July 1, 1937, the beginning of the new fiscal year.

In his memoir, Run-Through, Houseman wrote about the circumstances surrounding the opening night at the Maxine Elliott Theatre. All the performers had been enjoined not to perform on stage for the production when it opened on July 14, 1937. The cast and crew left their government-owned theatre and walked 20 blocks to another theatre, with the audience following. No one knew what to expect; when they got there Blitzstein himself was at the piano and started playing the introduction music. One of the amateur performers, Olive Stanton, who played the part of Moll, the prostitute, stood up in the audience, and began singing her part. All the other performers, in turn, stood up for their parts. Thus the "oratorio" version of the show was born. Apparently, Welles had designed some intricate scenery, which ended up never being used. The event was so successful that it was repeated several times on subsequent nights, with everyone trying to remember and reproduce what had happened spontaneously the first night. The incident, however, led to Houseman being fired and Welles's resignation from Project No. 891.

Mercury Theatre 
That same year, 1937, after detaching themselves from the Federal Theatre Project, Houseman and Welles did The Cradle Will Rock as an independent production on Broadway. They also founded the acclaimed New York drama company, the Mercury Theatre. Houseman wrote of their collaboration at this time:

On the broad wings of the Federal eagle, we had risen to success and fame beyond ourselves as America's youngest, cleverest, most creative and audacious producers to whom none of the ordinary rules of the theater applied.

Armed with a manifesto written by Houseman declaring their intention to foster new talent, experiment with new types of plays, and appeal to the same audiences that frequented the Federal Theater the company was designed largely to offer plays of the past, preferably those that "...seem to have emotion or factual bearing on contemporary life."  The company mounted several notable productions, the most remarkable being its first commercial production of Julius Caesar.  Houseman called the decision to use modern dress "an essential element in Orson's conception of the play as a political melodrama with clear contemporary parallels."

Houseman and Welles later presented The Shoemaker's Holiday (1938), Heartbreak House (1938) and Danton's Death (1938).

Radio
Beginning in the summer of 1938, the Mercury Theatre was featured in a weekly dramatic radio program on the CBS network, initially promoted as First Person Singular before gaining the official title The Mercury Theatre on the Air. An adaptation of Treasure Island was scheduled for the program's first broadcast, for which Houseman worked feverishly on the script. However, a week before the show was to air, Welles decided that a program far more dramatic was required. To Houseman's horror, Treasure Island was abandoned in favor of Bram Stoker's Dracula, with Welles playing the infamous vampire. During an all night session at Perkins' Restaurant, Welles and Houseman hashed out a script.

The Mercury Theatre on the Air featured an impressive array of talents, including Agnes Moorehead, Bernard Herrmann, and George Coulouris.

"The War of the Worlds" (1938) 
The Mercury Theatre on the Air subsequently became famous for its notorious 1938 radio adaptation of H. G. Wells' The War of the Worlds, which had put much of the country in a panic. By all accounts, Welles was shocked by the panic that ensued. According to Houseman, "he hadn't the faintest idea what the effect would be". CBS was inundated with calls; newspaper switchboards were jammed.

Without Welles, Houseman staged Douglas Moore's The Devil and Daniel Webster (1939).

Film producer

Too Much Johnson (1938) 
While Houseman was teaching at Vassar College, he produced Welles' never-completed second short film, Too Much Johnson (1938). The film was never publicly screened and no print of the film was thought to have survived. Footage was rediscovered in 2013.

Citizen Kane (1941)
The Welles-Houseman collaboration continued in Hollywood. In the spring of 1939, Welles began preliminary discussions with RKO's head of production, George Schaefer, with Welles and his Mercury players being given a two-picture deal, in which Welles would produce, direct, perform, and have full creative control of his projects.

For his motion picture debut, Welles first considered adapting Joseph Conrad's Heart of Darkness for the screen. A 200-page script was written. Some models were constructed, while the shooting of initial test footage had begun. However, little, if anything, had been done either to whittle down the budgetary difficulties or begin filming. When RKO threatened to eliminate the payment of salaries by December 31 if no progress had been made, Welles announced that he would pay his cast out of his own pocket. Houseman proclaimed that there wasn't enough money in their business account to pay anyone. During a corporate dinner for the Mercury crew, Welles exploded, calling his partner a "bloodsucker" and a "crook". As Houseman attempted to leave, Welles began hurling dish heaters at him, effectively ending both their partnership and friendship.

Houseman later, however, played a pivotal role in ushering Citizen Kane (1941), which starred Welles. Welles telephoned Houseman asking him to return to Hollywood to "babysit" screenwriter Herman J. Mankiewicz while he completed the script, and keep him away from alcohol. Still drawn to Welles, as was virtually everyone in his sphere, Houseman agreed. Although Welles took credit for the screenplay of Kane, Houseman stated that the credit belonged to Mankiewicz, an assertion that led to a final break with Welles. Houseman took some credit himself for the general shaping of the story line and for editing the script. In an interview with Penelope Huston for Sight & Sound magazine (Autumn, 1962) Houseman said that the writing of Citizen Kane was a delicate subject:

In 1975, during an interview with Kate McCauley, Houseman stated that film critic Pauline Kael in her essay "Raising Kane", had caused an "idiotic controversy" over the issue: "The argument is Orson's own fault. He wanted to be given all the credit because he's a hog. Actually, it is his film. So it's a ridiculous argument."

Return to the theatre 
After he and Welles went their separate ways, Houseman went on to direct The Devil and Daniel Webster (1939) and Liberty Jones (1941) and produced the Mercury Theatre's stage production of Native Son (1941) on Broadway, directed by Welles.

David O. Selznick
In Hollywood he became a vice-president of David O. Selznick Productions. His most notable achievement during that time was helping adapt and produce the adaptation of Jane Eyre (1943) which starred Joan Fontaine and Welles.

World War II
In the aftermath of the attack on Pearl Harbor, Houseman quit his job and became the head of the overseas radio division of the Office of War Information (OWI), working for the Voice of America whilst also managing its operations in New York City.

Paramount
In 1945 Houseman signed a contract with Paramount Pictures to produce movies. His first credit for that studio was The Unseen (1945). He followed it with Miss Susie Slagle's (1945) and The Blue Dahlia (1946), both with Veronica Lake. The latter, starring Alan Ladd and written by Raymond Chandler, has become a classic.

He left Paramount and returned to Broadway to direct Lute Song (1946) with Mary Martin.

Back in Hollywood he produced Letter from an Unknown Woman (1948) for Max Ophuls at Universal.

RKO
Houseman went to RKO where he produced They Live by Night (1948) the directorial debut of Nicholas Ray. He also did The Company She Keeps (1949) and On Dangerous Ground (1951).

He returned to Broadway to produce Joy to the World (1949) and King Lear (1950-51), the latter with Louis Calhern.

MGM
RKO's head of production had been Dore Schary. When Schary moved to MGM he offered Houseman a contract at the studio, which the producer accepted.

Houseman's stint at MGM began with Holiday for Sinners (1952); then he had a huge success with The Bad and the Beautiful (1952), directed by Vincente Minnelli. He followed it with the film adaptation of Julius Caesar (1953) (for which he received an Academy Award nomination for Best Picture)

Also popular was Executive Suite (1954), a highly creative adaptation by Ernest Lehman of Cameron Hawley's bestselling novel. However, although Her Twelve Men (1954), Minnelli's The Cobweb (1955) and Fritz Lang's Moonfleet (1955) all lost money. So did Lust for Life (1956), a biopic directed by Minnelli of Vincent van Gogh, although it was extremely well-received critically.

Television and theatre
Houseman moved into television producing, notably doing The Seven Lively Arts (1957) and episodes of Playhouse 90.

He also returned to theatre, producing revivals of Measure for Measure (1957) and The Duchess of Malfi (1957).

Return to MGM
Houseman was enticed back to MGM as a producer, and given his own production company, John Houseman Productions. His films were All Fall Down (1962), Two Weeks in Another Town (1962) and In the Cool of the Day (1963).

Return to television
Houseman returned to television where he made The Great Adventure and Journey to America (1964). He returned to Hollywood briefly to produce This Property Is Condemned (1966), then returned to TV for Evening Primrose (1966).

He returned to Broadway, directing Pantagleize (1967).

Teaching

The Juilliard School and The Acting Company

Houseman became the founding director of the Drama Division at The Juilliard School, and held this position from 1968 until 1976. The first graduating class in 1972 included Kevin Kline and Patti LuPone; subsequent classes under Houseman's leadership included Christopher Reeve, Mandy Patinkin, and Robin Williams.

Unwilling to see that very first class disbanded upon graduation, Houseman and his Juilliard colleague Margot Harley formed them into an independent, touring repertory company they named the "Group 1 Acting Company." The organization was subsequently renamed The Acting Company, and has been active for more than 40 years. Houseman served as the producing artistic director through 1986, and Harley has been the company's producer since its founding.  Writing in The New York Times in 1996, Mel Gussow called it "the major touring classical theater in the United States."

Theatre
Houseman continued to be involved in theatre, producing The School for Wives (1971), The Three Sisters (1973), The Beggar's Opera (1973), Scapin (1973), Next Time I'll Sing to You (1974), The Robber Bridegroom (1975), Edward II (1975), and The Time of Your Life (1975)

He directed The Country Girl (1972), Don Juan in Hell (1973), Measure for Measure  (1973), and Clarence Darrow (1974) (with Henry Fonda).

In 1979, Houseman earned induction into the American Theater Hall of Fame

Acting

Houseman had acted occasionally during the early part of his career and he had a brief but important part in Seven Days in May (1964).

Houseman first became widely known to the public for his Golden Globe and Academy Award-winning role as Professor Charles Kingsfield in the film The Paper Chase (1973). The film was a success and launched Houseman into an unexpected late career as a character actor.

Houseman played Energy Corporation Executive Bartholomew in the film Rollerball (1975), and was in the thrillers Three Days of the Condor (1975) and St Ives (1976).

Houseman appeared on TV in Fear on Trial (1975), The Adams Chronicles (1976), Truman at Potsdam (1976), Hazard's People (1976) and Six Characters in Search of an Author (1976). Houseman was reunited with The Paper Chase co-star Lindsay Wagner in 1976's "Kill Oscar", a three-part joint episode of the popular science fiction series The Bionic Woman and The Six Million Dollar Man; he played the scientific genius Dr. Franklin.

He continued appearing on TV in Captains and the Kings (1976), The Displaced Person (1977), a version of Our Town (1977), Washington: Behind Closed Doors (1977), The Best of Families (1977), Aspen, The Last Convertible (1978), The French Atlantic Affair (1978) and The Associates (1980).

In films he parodied Sydney Greenstreet in the Neil Simon film The Cheap Detective (1978) and was in Old Boyfriends (1980), John Carpenter's The Fog (1980), Wholly Moses! (1981) and My Bodyguard (1981).

Houseman briefly returned to producing with the TV movie Gideon's Trumpet (1980), which he also appeared in and Choices of the Heart (1983). He produced one more show on Broadway, The Curse of an Aching Heart (1982).

He acted in The Babysitter (1980), A Christmas Without Snow (1980), Ghost Story (1981), Mork & Mindy, Murder by Phone (1982) (second billed), Marco Polo (1982), and American Playhouse (1982).

Television star
Having played a Harvard Law School professor in the film The Paper Chase (1973), he reprised the role in a television series of the same name, which ran from 1978 to 1979 and 1983 to 1986. During that time, he received two Golden Globe nominations for "Best Actor in a TV Series—Drama".

In the 1980s Houseman became more widely known for his role as grandfather Edward Stratton II in Silver Spoons, which starred Rick Schroder, and for his commercials for brokerage firm Smith Barney, which featured the catchphrase, "They make money the old fashioned way... they earn it." Another was Puritan brand cooking oil, with "less saturated fat than the leading oil", featuring the famous 'tomato test'.

He played Jewish author Aaron Jastrow (loosely based on the real life figure of Bernard Berenson) in the highly acclaimed 1983 miniseries The Winds of War (receiving a fourth Golden Globe nomination). He declined to reprise the role in the sequel War and Remembrance miniseries (the role then went to Sir John Gielgud).

However he was in the miniseries A.D. (1984), Noble House (1986), and Lincoln (1986).

Personal life 
Houseman had an affair with actress Joan Fontaine after her marriage to actor Brian Aherne ended. "Ours was what was known in Hollywood as a 'romance,' -- which meant that we slept together three or four nights a week, got invited to parties together, went away together for weekends and sometimes talked about getting married without really meaning it," Houseman wrote in Front and Center, his second autobiography.

Final years and death 
Later film appearances included Bright Lights, Big City (1988) and Another Woman (1988).

In 1988, he appeared in his last two roles—cameos in the films The Naked Gun: From the Files of Police Squad! and Scrooged. He played a driving instructor (whose mannerisms parodied many of his prior roles) in the former, and himself in the latter. Both films were released after his death.

On October 31, 1988, Houseman died at age 86 of spinal cancer at his home in Malibu, California. He was cremated and his ashes were scattered at sea.

In popular culture 
Houseman was portrayed by Cary Elwes in the Tim Robbins–directed film Cradle Will Rock (1999). Actor Eddie Marsan plays the role of Houseman in Richard Linklater's film Me & Orson Welles (2009). Houseman was played by actor Jonathan Rigby in the Doctor Who audio drama Invaders from Mars set around the War of the Worlds broadcast. Actor Sam Troughton portrayed Houseman in the 2020 film Mank.

In the Seinfeld episode "The Face Painter", Jerry tells Elaine that Alec Berg has "a good John Houseman name". Jerry then imitates Houseman, speaking Alec Berg's name in a non-rhotic, gravelly rasp.

In the SCTV episode "Jane Eyrehead", guest star Robin Williams portrayed Houseman in the sketch commercial "An Evening with John Houseman", in which he reads the Mellonville phonebook to a cheering theater audience.

Filmography

Film

As actor (film)

As producer (film)

Television

As actor (television)

As producer (television)

References

External links 
 
 
 
 
 "The Theatre: Marvelous Boy" – Time May 9, 1938
 Interviews with Howard Koch on the infamous Mercury Theatre's War of the Worlds radio broadcast

1902 births
1988 deaths
Male actors from Bucharest
Deaths from cancer in California
Neurological disease deaths in California
Deaths from spinal cancer
American male film actors
American theatre managers and producers
American radio producers
American radio writers
American film producers
American male screenwriters
American people of French-Jewish descent
American people of Irish descent
American people of Welsh descent
British male film actors
20th-century American male actors
20th-century British male actors
People educated at Clifton College
Juilliard School faculty
Jewish theatre directors
Federal Theatre Project administrators
Best Supporting Actor Academy Award winners
Best Supporting Actor Golden Globe (film) winners
Voice of America people
Romanian emigrants to the United Kingdom
Naturalised citizens of the United Kingdom
British emigrants to the United States
British people of Jewish descent
20th-century American male writers
20th-century American screenwriters
People of the United States Office of War Information